Hans Mooser (born 18 February 1915; date of death unknown) was a Swiss canoeist who competed in the 1936 Summer Olympics. In 1936 he finished sixth in the folding K-1 10000 m event.

References
Hans Mooser's profile at Sports Reference.com

1915 births
Year of death missing
Canoeists at the 1936 Summer Olympics
Olympic canoeists of Switzerland
Swiss male canoeists